Nebria reflexa is a species of ground beetle in the Nebriinae subfamily that is endemic to Japan. The species have 4 subspecies all of which can be found only in Japan.

References

reflexa
Beetles described in 1883
Beetles of Asia
Endemic fauna of Japan